Chester W. Nimitz High School is a public high school in the Irving Independent School District, Irving, Texas.  It was named for U.S. Navy Admiral Chester W. Nimitz. Nimitz High School is one of five public high schools in the Irving Independent School District.

As of 2018, the school ethnicity was 1% Native American, 2.1% Asian, 7.7% African American, 8.7% White, and 79.5% Hispanic. Approximately 69% are considered economically disadvantaged.  Nimitz faculty totals approximately 179 with approximately 39% having advanced degrees.

Nimitz High School's Academic Decathlon team won the state championship in 2004 and has placed in the top 5 since the school's establishment. The JROTC Team competes at the state and national level in many categories. The JROTC Team won the state championship in 2020, most notable are the Black Knights and the Instructors: LT Smalls (USN Retired), First Sergeant Carbajal (USMC Retired). 

Nimitz received a B (80) for its scaled score on the Texas Education Agency's 2019 Accountability overall rating, and received a distinction designation for comparative academic growth.

Curriculum
The school year consists of six, six week instructional terms.  The regular school days consists of eight class periods (an exception is 4th period which is longer due to lunches).  A variety of extensive instructional programs meet the needs of students with different learning abilities and interests.  In addition to regular courses, classes taught at Nimitz also include Pre-AP, Advanced Placement, dual enrollment, gifted and talented, special education, career and technical education, and English as a Second Language.

Subjects in which students may earn Pre-AP credit are English, languages other than English, reading, mathematics, science, and social studies.

Advanced Placement courses include English 3 and 4, Capstone- Seminar and Research, Calculus AB, Calculus BC, Statistics, Biology II, Chemistry II, U.S. Government, Economics, U.S. History, World History, Human Geography, Psychology, Spanish (all), French, German, Music Theory, and Anatomy and Physiology.  Every student taking an AP course is required to take the AP exam in May.  Dual credit courses include U. S. History, U.S. Government, College Algebra, and English IV.

Nimitz students  participate in extracurricular activities and community service.  Marching band, athletics, newspaper, yearbook, drill team, FCCLA, UIL Math, UIL Social Studies, choir, orchestra, cheerleading, ballet folklorico, winter guard, debate, theater, student council, Academic Decathlon, Naval Junior Reserve Officers Training Corps, and service and special interest clubs are some of the school sponsored activities available to students.

In 2016, modifications were designed to update and improve the fine arts facilities and athletics areas at each of the district's three comprehensive high schools. At Nimitz, The band hall, choir room, and orchestra room were expanded, and new practice rooms were built along the main fine arts hallway. A new black box theatre was also built adjacent to the auditorium.

Advisory
Nimitz High School is dedicated to helping students make a connection to high school through supporting them through advisory.  All students 9-12 participate in advisory where individual attention is given to every student's personal, educational, and career development. Students currently meet six times per year in their advisory group, which takes place daily for one week, once during each 6 week term.

Sports
 http://www.5atexasfootball.com/ssp/region_1
Volleyball, Baseball, Wrestling, Football, Boys Soccer, Girls Soccer, Girls Basketball, Boys Basketball, Boys Tennis, Girls Tennis, Boys Cross Country, Girls Cross Country, Boys Track, Girls Track, Boys Swimming, Girls Swimming, Gymnastics, Water Polo, Golf, Lacrosse, and Bowling are sports currently played at Nimitz.

Notable alumni
Kerry Cooks '93 - Former Iowa and NFL defensive back. Currently a coach at LSU.
Michael Huff '01 - University of Texas at Austin where he became a college football star and the seventh pick in the 2006 NFL Draft for the Oakland Raiders. Then with the Denver Broncos.  Currently at coach at University of Texas at Austin
Tammy Rogers 1983 - Grammy Winner 2016 Best Bluegrass Album  
Delontae Scott '15 - NFL player

References

External links
 
Official Homepage (Archive)
Official Alumni Website

High schools in Irving, Texas
Irving Independent School District high schools